Indo-pop also known as Indonesian pop or I-pop is loosely defined as Indonesian pop music; however, in a wider sense it can also encompass Indonesian pop culture, which also includes Indonesian cinema and sinetrons (Indonesian TV drama).

Indonesian pop music today is sometimes influenced by trends and recordings from West music. However, in return the Indonesian style of pop music has influenced the regional pop culture in Southeast Asia, especially the Malaysian pop scene that began to imitating the Indonesian style of pop music in late 2000s. Indo pop usually expresses contemporary Indonesian sentiments and lifestyles, generally about love and social life related to relationships. Indonesian-pop music with sad and mellow melodies is also very popular and selling very well.

History

1960s - 1990s 

Koes Bersaudara later formed as Koes Plus is considered one of the pioneers of Indonesian pop and rock 'n roll music in 1960s and 1970s. The American and British music influences were obvious in the music of Koes Bersaudara, The Beatles were known to be the main influences of this band. 

Indonesian pop music in the 1970s also gave rise to legendary musicians and singers such as Chrisye, Titiek Puspa, and Ebiet G. Ade. Their work in the country's music industry was very large and influenced the development of music after that. These names are still stuck in the minds of many people because they are the pioneers of pop music in this country. 

The Indonesian music industry in the 1970s was quite advanced where the pop music genre became very popular, presenting great works from legendary musicians from Chrisye, Ebiet G. Ade and Titiek Puspa. Prambors (LCLR) songwriting competition in 1977 was a breaker of stagnation in the pop music industry at that time. This event also gave birth to many new musicians in the following years.

Entering the decade of the 80s and 90s. Legendary musicians appeared, Iwan Fals was very popular at that time even the music is still a favorite of many people until now. The songs are quite political, the music raises many issues such as war (Puing), the environment (Isi Rimba Tak Ada Tempat Berpijak Lagi), poverty (Siang Sebrang Istana), child labor (Sore Tugu Pancoran). Because the songs are political and criticize the government a lot. Some of his songs were banned by the authoritarian Suharto government at that time.

In the late 80s, boy bands and girl bands began to emerge. The first boyband to debut in Indonesia was Trio Libels, which debuted in the late 1980s. This was followed by the first wave or generation of boybands and girlbands, and several notable groups that emerged from this wave are Cool Colors, Coboy, ME, T-Five, Warna, Rida Sita Dewi, AB Three, and Bening.

2000s - 2010s

In 2000s, the popular bands include Peterpan, Dewa 19, Gigi, Sheila on 7, Padi, Ada Band, Ungu, Letto, Nidji, and D'Masiv, all of which are featured on MTV Asia and tour regularly nationwide plus the neighbouring countries of Singapore and Malaysia. These bands have received immense reception in the region (including Brunei), some people have attributed this to the neutral shared vocabulary in songwriting compared to the spoken vernaculars spoken between these countries while some have speculated on the proliferation of pirated cassettes and CDs being the cause. The popularity of Indonesian music in Malaysia in particular had become so overwhelming that in 2008, demands had been made for radio stations there to restrict the number of Indonesian songs being aired so local musicians would be given a fairer chance.

Some of these pop rock bands incorporate traditional Malay roots into their sound, reviving the old Orkes Melayu style once popular in the region across Indonesia and Malaysia. Such bands belong to the "Band Pop Melayu" Malay Pop subgenre which became popular in late 2000s with acts like Kangen Band, Wali, Hijau Daun, Armada, Angkasa and ST 12.

Indonesia first experienced the Korean wave in the 2000s, leading to the popularization of K-dramas and K-pop. The rising popularity of K-pop gave rise to a second wave or generation of boybands and girlbands in Indonesia. There are several K-pop influenced groups that emerged from this wave, one of the earliest being G-String,  but the most notable are SM*SH, CJR and Cherrybelle. Other popular groups include 7Icons, XO-IX, Hitz, and Dragonboyz. It is from this era that the term "I-pop" emerged and was used by several groups including Cherrybelle, 7Icons, and XO-IX.

Several J-pop influenced groups also debuted around the same time. In 2011, Super Girlies, a J-pop influenced girlband, debuted; their first single is a cover of a Berryz Kobo song. In the same year, Japanese idol group AKB48 launched its first sister group in Jakarta, JKT48. JKT48 introduced the "idols you can meet" concept in Indonesia, and distinguished itself from other groups by calling themselves an idol group, rather than a "girlband" particularly. Subsequently, several independent J-pop influenced "idol groups" made their debuts, including LuSca, which debuted in 2012.

Connection with Indonesia films
Indonesian films have a strong relationship with Indonesian music. Most Indonesian films feature soundtracks consisting primarily of Indonesian music,
generally Indonesian pop and some rock.

International popularity

The high popularity of Indonesian pop music is now limited to Malay-speaking countries. The wider coverage is only ASEAN countries such as the Philippines, Vietnam and Cambodia.

Indonesian singers such as Agnez Mo have been gaining popularity in neighbouring Asian countries such as Malaysia, Singapore, Vietnam, Sri Lanka, Cambodia and the Philippines. 

The 2018 single, "Heaven" recorded by Afgan, Isyana Sarasvati and Rendy Pandugo, became popular not only in Indonesia, but also in Taiwan, Vietnam and Sri Lanka, reaching the top 10 in all four countries.

In 2018, during the Asian Games, the official theme song "Meraih Bintang", performed by pop dangdut singer Via Vallen became viral in numerous countries across Asia and beyond; with many singers performing translated covers of the song in their respective languages and uploading the videos on YouTube.

Nevertheless, prominent Indonesian musicians such as Rich Brian, NIKI, Stephanie Poetri, Weird Genius, and Rainych have acquired recognition internationally between 2018 and 2022. They are primarily associated with international record labels and represent the rise of Indo pop in international popularity.

See also 
 List of Indonesian pop musicians
 Indonesian rock
 Indonesian hip hop
 Malay Pop
 Dangdut
 Campursari

References 

 
Pop music by country